Moscovium (115Mc) is a synthetic element, and thus a standard atomic weight cannot be given. Like all synthetic elements, it has no known stable isotopes. The first isotope to be synthesized was 288Mc in 2004. There are five known radioisotopes from 286Mc to 290Mc. The longest-lived isotope is 290Mc with a half-life of 0.65 seconds.

List of isotopes 
The isotopes undergo alpha decay into the corresponding isotope of nihonium, with half-lives increasing as neutron numbers increase.

|-
| 286Mc 
| style="text-align: right" | 115
| style="text-align: right" | 171
|
| 
| α
| 282Nh
|
|-
| 287Mc
| style="text-align:right" | 115
| style="text-align:right" | 172
| 287.19070(52)#
| 
| α
| 283Nh
|
|-
| 288Mc
| style="text-align:right" | 115
| style="text-align:right" | 173
| 288.19274(62)#
| 
| α
| 284Nh
|
|-
| 289Mc
| style="text-align:right" | 115
| style="text-align:right" | 174
| 289.19363(89)#
| 
| α
| 285Nh
|
|-
| 290Mc
| style="text-align:right" | 115
| style="text-align:right" | 175
| 290.19598(73)#
| 
| α
| 286Nh
|

Nucleosynthesis

Target-projectile combinations
The table below contains various combinations of targets and projectiles which could be used to form compound nuclei with Z = 115. Each entry is a combination for which calculations have provided estimates for cross section yields from various neutron evaporation channels. The channel with the highest expected yield is given.

Hot fusion
Hot fusion reactions are processes that create compound nuclei at high excitation energy (~40–50 MeV, hence "hot"), leading to a reduced probability of survival from fission. The excited nucleus then decays to the ground state via the emission of 3–5 neutrons. Fusion reactions utilizing 48Ca nuclei usually produce compound nuclei with intermediate excitation energies (~30–35 MeV) and are sometimes referred to as "warm" fusion reactions. This leads, in part, to relatively high yields from these reactions.

238U(51V,xn)289−xMc
There are strong indications that this reaction was performed in late 2004 as part of a uranium(IV) fluoride target test at the GSI. No reports have been published suggesting that no product atoms were detected, as anticipated by the team.

243Am(48Ca,xn)291−xMc (x=2,3,4,5)
This reaction was first performed by the team in Dubna in July–August 2003. In two separate runs they were able to detect 3 atoms of 288Mc and a single atom of 287Mc. The reaction was studied further in June 2004 in an attempt to isolate the descendant 268Db from the 288Mc decay chain. After chemical separation of a +4/+5 fraction, 15 SF decays were measured with a lifetime consistent with 268Db. In order to prove that the decays were from dubnium-268, the team repeated the reaction in August 2005 and separated the +4 and +5 fractions and further separated the +5 fractions into tantalum-like and niobium-like ones. Five SF activities were observed, all occurring in the niobium-like fractions and none in the tantalum-like fractions, proving that the product was indeed isotopes of dubnium.

In a series of experiments between October 2010 – February 2011, scientists at the FLNR studied this reaction at a range of excitation energies. They were able to detect 21 atoms of 288Mc and one atom of 289Mc, from the 2n exit channel. This latter result was used to support the synthesis of tennessine. The 3n excitation function was completed with a maximum at ~8 pb. The data was consistent with that found in the first experiments in 2003.

This reaction was run again at five different energies in 2021 to test the new gas-filled separator at Dubna's SHE-factory. They detected 6 chains of 289Mc, 58 chains of 288Mc, and 2 chains of 287Mc. For the first time the 5n channel was observed with 2 atoms of 286Mc.

Reaction yields
The table below provides cross-sections and excitation energies for hot fusion reactions producing moscovium isotopes directly. Data in bold represent maxima derived from excitation function measurements. + represents an observed exit channel.

Theoretical calculations

Decay characteristics
Theoretical calculations using a quantum-tunneling model support the experimental alpha-decay half-lives.

Evaporation residue cross sections
The table below contains various target-projectile combinations for which calculations have provided estimates for cross section yields from various neutron evaporation channels. The channel with the highest expected yield is given.

MD = multi-dimensional; DNS = Di-nuclear system; σ = cross section

References 

 Isotope masses from:

 Isotopic compositions and standard atomic masses from:

 Half-life, spin, and isomer data selected from the following sources.

 
Moscovium
Moscovium